Herbert Evans  (1868 – 7 October 1931) was a Labour Party politician in the United Kingdom.

He contested the 1929 general election in the Conservative safe seat of Maldon in Essex, where the Conservative vote fell but the gains were made by the Liberal candidate.

He was elected as Member of Parliament (MP) for Gateshead at a by-election in June 1931, following the death of the Labour MP Sir James Melville. However, four months later Evans died in office aged 63, on the day when Parliament was dissolved for the 1931 general election.

See also
List of United Kingdom MPs with the shortest service

References

External links 
 

1868 births
1931 deaths
Labour Party (UK) MPs for English constituencies
UK MPs 1929–1931